Teresa Wong (Chinese: Wong Hiu-nam, 王曉南) is a traditional Chinese Huqin (Erhu) player, originating from Hong Kong. She started her training at the age of six and studied at the Central Music Academy. She joined the China Central Orchestra after graduation and has performed with the Hong Kong Chinese Orchestra. She has been called the 'Vanessa-Mae of erhu'.

Her music is very similar to the likes of artists such as 12 Girls Band or Vanessa Mae. Her musical technique draws from the Huqin family of instruments used in the Tang Dynasty (618AD - 907AD in China). Currently Teresa has one album, Modern Tang Allures.

References

External links 
 Teresa Wong 

Living people
Year of birth missing (living people)
Erhu players
Hong Kong musicians